The Realness is a 2001 hip hop album by Cormega.

The Realness or Realness may also refer to:

Arts and entertainment 
The Realness (podcast), 2018 audio documentary produced by WNYC studios
The Realness (song), 2016 song by Prodigy
RuPaul
Realness, 2015 studio album by RuPaul
The Realness (RuPaul's Drag Race), season seven of RuPaul's drag race
The Realness of Fortune Ball, season eight of RuPaul's drag race

See also 
Redefining Realness